Massey Hall is a performing arts theatre in Toronto, Ontario, Canada. Opened in 1894, it is known for its outstanding acoustics and was the long-time hall of the Toronto Symphony Orchestra. An intimate theatre, it was originally designed to seat 3,500 patrons, but after extensive renovations in the 1940s, it now seats up to 2,765. It has an extensive history of concerts by artists of many musical genres which continues today.

Massey Hall was a gift to the people of Toronto from industrialist Hart Massey. Massey Hall was designated a National Historic Site of Canada on June 15, 1981. The hall closed in July 2018 for a two-year-long renovation including a new seven-storey addition and two smaller concert rooms. It re-opened in 2021.

It is operated by The Corporation of Massey Hall and Roy Thomson Hall, a non-profit charitable organization. It is located at the intersection of Shuter and Victoria Streets, just east of Yonge Street, in downtown Toronto.

History

The idea of Massey Music Hall (its original name) began with Hart Massey, who wanted to build a music hall in order to fill the need for a secular meeting place where people from Toronto and area could meet and enjoy choral music not of a religious theme. Massey also wanted to construct the building in memory of his son Charles, who loved music. Massey also did not want the music hall to make large profits. He wanted both rich and poor to attend events. Ideally, once all expenses were paid, Massey wanted tickets for a season of lectures to sell for $1.

The building was designed with a neoclassical facade, and features moorish arches that span the width of the interior hall. This interior was inspired by the Alhambra Palace in Spain as well as Louis Sullivan's Chicago Auditorium. The exterior is Palladian architecture while the interior is Moorish Revival architecture. The exterior neoclassical facade was a preference voiced from Lillian, Hart Massey's daughter. Around the top of the hall are thirty stained glass windows, each depicting a famous composer, made by the Faircloth Brothers glass firm. The foyer is finished in Art Deco style.

Construction was financed by Massey, the founder of the Massey Manufacturing (later Massey Ferguson) manufacturing conglomerate. The hall's debut concert was a choral performance of Handel's 'Messiah' on June 14, 1894.

Ten years after the completion of construction, (after the 1904 Toronto Great Fire), a pair of fire escape staircases were installed along the front face of the building. They were installed to deal with fire concerns of the building. These fire escapes (now removed) were considered an iconic part of Massey Hall's exterior. At some point in its renovation history, three of the windows at the front of the venue were converted into doors. The doors at the front of the venue were painted red (from their earlier brown-gold colour), a large neon sign was hung above the main entrance, and notice boards listing upcoming acts were revamped on either side of those doors.

The Albert Building, at 15 Shuter Street, was added as a janitorial residence in 1917, and later converted as backstage space. It has since been demolished and replaced by a new addition during the 2010s renovations. It had a unique two-storey oriel window. In 1933, the Massey Foundation undertook further renovations to the hall. The venue simplified its name to Massey Hall at this time. Further renovations occurred in the 1940s.

In 1994, to commemorate the hall's 100th anniversary, the basement was completely refurbished to include Centuries, a fully stocked bar. Prior to this addition, alcohol was not permitted in the hall. The decor of Centuries includes hundreds of photos of artists who have performed there over the years (largely collecting portraits of popular music stars since the eighties) including many autographs.  Centuries has a capacity of 220 people, and often hosts CD release parties and post-show parties for the visiting artists. Roughly five years after Centuries was created, an additional bar in the balcony lounge was added.

In 2013, Massey Hall began a long-awaited major renovation with the demolition of the Albert Building and the preparation of the rear space for construction activities. In July 2018, Massey Hall announced phase two of the renovation, entitled "Massey Hall Forever", which included extensive exterior and interior renovations, expanded stage, a new seven-story addition, two new smaller concert rooms and a new retractable seating system. The new addition is called the Allied Music Centre, located on the site of the Albert Building. It incorporates an artists' lab, studio, lounge and theatre. It was completed in 2022.

Historic designations
In 1973, Toronto City Council designated Massey Hall a Heritage Property under the province's Ontario Heritage Act. Massey Hall was designated a National Historic Site of Canada on June 15, 1981.

Notable performers and events

The primary use of the hall has been for musical performances, but the hall has been used for many types of events, including public memorials, speaking tours, boxing, among others. Many dignitaries have attended the hall since its inauguration. In 1901, the Duke and Duchess of Cornwall and York (the future King George V and his wife Queen Mary) visited with Canadian Prime Minister Wilfrid Laurier. Many prominent  choirs, comedians, musicians, musical groups, singers and speakers have appeared on the stage of Massey Hall. The hall was also a prominent location for political speeches before the development of television.

Until 1984, the primary performer at the hall was the Toronto Symphony Orchestra, along with the Toronto Mendelssohn Choir. Operatic singers have included Montserrat Caballe, Maria Callas, Enrico Caruso, Luciano Pavarotti and Vladimir Rosing. Classical musicians have included George Gershwin, Glenn Gould, Vladimir Horowitz, Oscar Peterson and Arturo Toscanini.

Popular musicians and singers have included Tears For Fears, Justin Bieber, Cream, Bob Dylan,  Billy Joel, The Kinks, Kraftwerk, Lenny Kravitz, Gordon Lightfoot, Yngwie Malmsteen, Bob Marley and The Wailers, Nightwish, Joe Satriani, Seventeen, Ravi Shankar, Harry Styles, and Van Halen.

Speakers at the hall have included William Booth, Winston Churchill, Helen Keller, Thomas Mann and the Dalai Lama. Comics have included Jerry Seinfeld and Russell Peters.

Notable appearances, concerts and related media

In May 1953, Massey Hall was the location of the notable Charlie Parker-Dizzy Gillespie concert. Accompanying Gillespie and Parker were Bud Powell, Max Roach and Charles Mingus. The concert was recorded and released as Jazz at Massey Hall.

Neil Young's performance on January 19, 1971, was recorded and later released as a live album, entitled Live at Massey Hall 1971. Young has since performed several times at Massey Hall.

In June 1976 Rush recorded the live album All the World's a Stage here. Max Webster, a Toronto band, opened for Rush and would later headline at the venue in 1977 and 1978, followed by a solo performance by Kim Mitchell, formerly of Max Webster, in 1984.

On January 8, 1995, Ronnie Hawkins celebrated his 60th birthday with a concert at Massey, which was documented on the album Let It Rock. The concert featured performances by Hawkins, Carl Perkins, Jerry Lee Lewis, The Band and Larry Gowan. Jeff Healey sat in on guitar for most, if not all, of the performances. Hawkins' band, The Hawks, or permutations of it, backed most, if not all, of the acts. All of the musicians performing that night were collectively dubbed "The Rock ‘N’ Roll Orchestra".

The May 2008 performance by Matthew Good at Massey was released as a live album, entitled Live at Massey Hall.

In 2013, folk-rock band Whitehorse made their first appearance at the venue. In conjunction with the  concert, the band released the 2013 EP The Road to Massey Hall, comprising covers of songs by other musicians who had played the hall in the past.

In 2015, Canadian rock band Spirit of the West's performed at Massey. The preparations for it are profiled in the 2016 documentary film Spirit Unforgettable.

Toronto-born comedian Russell Peters' April 2016 appearances at Massey Hall were recorded for his Netflix stand-up special Almost Famous.

For the Juno Awards of 2021, which was performed from a variety of venues across Canada, the surviving members of The Tragically Hip performed their 2002 single "It's a Good Life If You Don't Weaken" with Feist on lead vocals, which marked the band's first televised performance since Gord Downie's death.

Revitalization 
In 2013, the Corporation of Roy Thomson and Massey Hall announced the closing of the performance space at Massey Hall for a revitalization project. The then 119-year-old building would proceed to undergo a two-phase renovation to restore some of the building's historic elements and the construction of new spaces to improve the community-driven centre.

Phase One 
Phase one of the Massey Hall Restoration began in 2013 and was completed in 2017. This  project consisted of the deconstruction of the adjacent Albert Building in order to prepare for the foundation of the new tower that was planned to be constructed in Phase Two.

Phase two 
The second and primary phase of the renovation was a  project with a budget of up to  million including contributions of  million from the Ontario and Canadian governments. The main aspects of the second phase included a full restoration of the interior and exterior elements and the construction of the new addition. The phase was completed in 2022. However, Massey Hall reopened for performances in November 2021.

Phase Two Full restoration 

The renovation of the interior of Massey Hall incorporated upgrading the technology by the implementation of mechanized removable seating to provide space for a standing general-admission area during performances and enhancing the audio and lighting systems. This refurbishment allowed for more flexibility for a variety of performances. The audio enhancements included diminishing the echo effect of sound that occurs during performances by introducing sound-absorbing plaster into the space.

The refurbishment also incorporated restoring the mixed architectural styles of Moorish revival, Palladian revival, and Art Deco found within the interior of the building, while also ensuring the structural integrity of the building. The main idea was to make sure the Hall looked as if nothing had changed. This refurbishment procedure included the original wood, steel beams and restorers, repairing details, and making new plaster molds of arch features if they were beyond repair. The ceiling had previously been covered in chicken wire in order to protect the audience below from debris. The renovation allowed for audiences to see the repaired detailed ceiling. The interior renewal also consisted of keeping the Hall’s original brass railings and new seats, which mimicked the originals.

The renovation moreover, focused on re-establishing the 100 original stained-glass windows that had been concealed with plywood since the 1950s due to sound disturbances reasons. The refurbishment of the panes involved the fitting of noise defensive shades for the glass during concerts and performances. The renovation also facilitated the updating of Massey Hall to meet current Canadian accessibility standards. These updates included a Passerelle to connect the old Massey Hall to the addition and an elevator allowing individuals easy access to the upper levels. The grand stage was rebuilt and lifted to provide better visibility from the upper gallery seats. The restoration additionally re-established new backstage artist and performer accommodations.

Allied Music Centre 
The construction of the new southern seven-story glass addition, named the Allied Music Centre was designed to accommodate more support spaces for the hall. Accessible through the outdoor passerelles, the addition contains rehearsal spaces, a performance studio, a lounge, new washrooms, dressing rooms for performers, and a loading dock for equipment and deliveries. It additionally contains the Deane Cameron Recording Studio, which gets its name from the late Massey Hall CEO. Located in the basement is a bar that has another performance space as well. The new modern glass passerelles leading to the tower hangs off the side of Massey Hall and contrasts with the original brick structure creating a connection between the new and the old. This state-of-the-art facility was designed and designated to be a space for the community, artistic development and outreach initiatives.

Architects 
The two-phase restoration process of Massey Hall was led by Marianne McKenna of KPMB Architects and Christopher Borgal of GBCA Architects. KPMB mainly focused on the architecture and interior design aspects, while GBCA focused on the heritage impact and restoration perspective. The total budget was  million.

Public transportation
An entrance to Queen subway station on Line 1 Yonge–University is located nearby at the corner of Shuter Street and Yonge Street.

The 501 Queen streetcar line has stops at the corner of Victoria Street and Queen Street.

References

External links

Massey Hall and Roy Thomson Hall
The Canadian Encyclopedia: Massey Hall

Concert halls in Canada
Music venues in Toronto
Theatres in Toronto
Event venues established in 1894
National Historic Sites in Ontario
Designated heritage properties in Ontario